Surp Hakob Church (Armenian: Սուրբ Հակոբ Եկեղեցի; also, Saint Jacob of Nisibis) is located in the Kanaker-Zeytun District within the city limits of Yerevan, the capital of Armenia. Its sister-church, Surp Astvatsatsin (also, Holy Mother of God Church, built in 1695), is located upon a hilltop to the northwest within sight of the Church of  S. Hakob.

History 
After the destruction of the original church by the 1679 Yerevan earthquake, S. Hakob was reconstructed through the donations of Hakobjan, a wealthy resident of Tbilisi. While serving as a seat of the bishop in 1868, the churchyard housed the diocesan school named after St. Sahak Partev, under the administration of Mesrop Archimandrite Smbatyants. During the Soviet period, the church was locked and converted into a storehouse. It resumed functioning once again in 1990.

Architecture 
The Church of S. Hakob is a three-nave basilica with no dome, but has a single cupola that sits off-center upon the gable roof. There are entrances to the interior at the southern and western walls. An elaborately carved entrance adorns the western façade, where there are khachkars dated 1504, 1571 and 1621 affixed to the wall. The interior of the structure contains a number of murals depicting saints that have been applied to the two pairs of columns and walls. The main altar is located at the eastern interior wall where there are adjacent sacristies.

To the southwest of the church is a gate from 1887 with some decoration that can be seen at the top.

Gallery

See also 
 List of churches in Yerevan

References

External links 

 Official website of Yerevan: Churches

Churches completed in 1695
17th-century churches
Armenian Apostolic church buildings in Yerevan
Christian monasteries in Armenia
Tourist attractions in Yerevan